Alvah T. Ramsdell (1852–1928) was an American architect from Dover, New Hampshire.  During his career he designed many substantial New Hampshire civic buildings.

Alvah Ramsdell was born April 15, 1852, in York, Maine.  He remained there until the age of 18, when he went to South Berwick to learn the carpenter's trade.  There, he served a three-year apprenticeship with William A. McIntyre.  He stayed for three more years, before going to Boston.  There he was employed by several notable contractors, and was kept busy with construction supervision.  It was at this time that he took up architecture, studying drawing and design in the city's night schools.

In 1889, Ramsdell went north to Dover, where he opened his own office.  He worked as an architect until he was elected state Senator.  By the time of his retirement, Ramsdell was Dover's leading architect.  He died in 1928.

He designed several buildings which are presently on the National Register of Historic Places.

Works
 1893 - Rollinsford Town Hall, 667 Main St, Rollinsford, New Hampshire
 1894 - Alton Town Hall, 1 Monument Sq, Alton, New Hampshire
 1895 - Strafford Banks Building, 83 Washington St, Dover, New Hampshire
 1895 - Wakefield Town Hall, 2 High St, Wakefield, New Hampshire
 1897 - Dover Children's Home, 207 Locust St, Dover, New Hampshire
 1897 - Wentworth Home for the Aged, 795 Central Ave, Dover, New Hampshire
 1898 - Chandler School, Green & Pleasant Sts, Somersworth, New Hampshire
 1902 - North Berwick High School, 21 Main St, North Berwick, Maine
 1904 - Dover High School, 61 Locust St, Dover, New Hampshire
 1908 - New Durham Town Hall, 4 Main St, New Durham, New Hampshire
 1910 - School Street School, 13 School St, Rochester, New Hampshire
 1911 - Ricker Memorial Chapel, Pine Hill Cemetery, Dover, New Hampshire
 1913 - Haverhill High School, 9 High St, Woodsville, New Hampshire
 1913 - Hotel Henderson, 47 Central St, Woodsville, New Hampshire
 1917 - Spalding School, 18 Maple St, Salisbury, Massachusetts

Gallery

References

1852 births
1928 deaths
Architects from Maine
Architects from New Hampshire
19th-century American architects
20th-century American architects
People from Dover, New Hampshire
People from York, Maine